Chelidura is a genus of earwigs in the family Forficulidae.

Species 
According to the Dermaptera Species File, the following species are accepted within Chelidura:

 Chelidura acanthopygia (Géné, 1832) 
 Chelidura apfelbecki Werner, 1907
 Chelidura aptera (von Muhlfeld, 1825) 
 Chelidura bolivari Dubrony, 1878
 Chelidura carpathica Steinmann & Kis, 1990
 Chelidura chelmosensis (Maran, 1965) 
 Chelidura euxina (Semenov, 1907) 
 Chelidura guentheri (Galvagni, 1994) 
 Chelidura mutica Krauss, 1886
 Chelidura nuristanica Steinmann, 1977
 Chelidura occidentalis de Fernandes, 1973
 Chelidura przewalskii (Semenov, 1908) 
 Chelidura pyrenaica (Bonelli, 1832) 
 Chelidura redux (Semenov, 1908) 
 Chelidura russica Steinmann, 1977
 Chelidura semenovi Bey-Bienko, 1934
 Chelidura specifica Steinmann, 1989
 Chelidura thoracica Fischer von Waldheim, 1846
 Chelidura tibetana (Semenov Tian-Shansky & Bey-Bienko, 1935) 
 Chelidura transsilvanica Ebner, 1932

References 

Forficulidae
Beetles described in 1825